Hamdi v. Rumsfeld, 542 U.S. 507 (2004), is a United States Supreme Court case in which the Court recognized the power of the U.S. government to detain enemy combatants, including U.S. citizens, but ruled that detainees who are U.S. citizens must have the rights of due process, and the ability to challenge their enemy combatant status before an impartial authority.

It reversed the dismissal by a lower court of a habeas corpus petition brought on behalf of Yaser Esam Hamdi, a U.S. citizen who was being detained indefinitely as an illegal enemy combatant after being captured in Afghanistan in 2001. Following the court's decision, on October 9, 2004, the U.S. government released Hamdi without charge and deported him to Saudi Arabia, where his family lived and he had grown up, on the condition that he renounce his U.S. citizenship and commit to travel prohibitions and other conditions.

Background

Early life and capture

Yaser Esam Hamdi was born in Louisiana as a citizen of the United States in 1980. That same year, he and his family moved to Saudi Arabia.

According to his father, Hamdi went to Afghanistan in the late summer of 2001 as a relief worker. He was then captured less than two months after his arrival by the Afghan Northern Alliance. They turned him over to U.S. military authorities during the U.S. invasion. He was classified as an enemy combatant by the U.S. armed forces and detained in connection with ongoing hostilities.

Hamdi's father claimed that Hamdi had gone to Afghanistan to do relief work and was trapped there when the U.S. invasion began, citing his young age and lack of travel experience as reasons for his being trapped.

Detention and legal challenge
After his capture in 2001, Hamdi was detained and interrogated in Afghanistan. In January 2002, the Americans transferred Hamdi to Guantanamo Bay. In April 2002, when officials discovered that he held U.S. (as well as Saudi) citizenship, they transferred him to a Naval brig in Norfolk, Virginia and finally to the Naval Consolidated Brig in Charleston, South Carolina. In June 2002, Hamdi's father, Esam Fouad Hamdi, filed a habeas corpus petition in the United States District Court for the Eastern District of Virginia to challenge his detention.

The Bush administration claimed that because Hamdi was caught in arms against the U.S., he could be properly detained as an enemy combatant, without any oversight of presidential decision making, and without access to an attorney or the court system.  The administration argued that this power was constitutional and necessary to effectively fight the War on Terror, declared by the Congress of the United States in the Authorization for Use of Military Force passed after the September 11 terrorist attacks.  The government used its detention authority to ensure that terrorists were no longer a threat while active combat operations continued and to ensure suspects could be fully interrogated.

District case
Judge Robert G. Doumar ruled that Hamdi's father was a proper "next friend" having standing to sue on behalf of his son, and ordered that a federal public defender be given access to Hamdi.  On appeal, however, the Fourth Circuit reversed the District Court's order, ruling that the District Court had failed to give proper deference to the government's "intelligence and security interests," and that it should proceed with a properly deferential investigation.

The case was sent back to the District Court, which denied the government's motion to dismiss Hamdi's petition. Judge Doumar found the government's evidence supporting Hamdi's detention "woefully inadequate," and based predominantly on hearsay and bare assertions.  The District Court ordered the government to produce numerous documents for in camera review by the court that would enable it to perform a "meaningful judicial review," such as the statements by the Northern Alliance regarding Hamdi's capture, the dates and circumstances of his capture and interrogations, and a list of all the officials involved in the determination of his "enemy combatant" status.

Appellate case 
The government appealed Judge Doumar's order to produce the evidence, and the Fourth Circuit again reversed the District Court. Because it was "undisputed that Hamdi was captured in a zone of active combat in a foreign theater of conflict," the Fourth Circuit said that it was not proper for any court to hear a challenge of his status. It ruled that the broad warmaking powers delegated to the President under Article Two of the United States Constitution and the principle of separation of powers prohibited courts from interfering in this vital area of national security.

After the Fourth Circuit denied a petition for rehearing en banc, Hamdi's father appealed to the U.S. Supreme Court. It granted certiorari review and reversed the Fourth Circuit's ruling. Hamdi was represented before the Court by the late Federal Public Defender Frank W. Dunham, Jr., and the Government's side was argued by the Principal Deputy Solicitor General, Paul Clement.

Opinion of the Court 
Though no single opinion of the Court commanded a majority, six of the nine justices of the Court agreed that the executive branch does not have the power to hold a U.S. citizen indefinitely without basic due process protections enforceable through judicial review.

Plurality opinion 
Justice O'Connor wrote a plurality opinion representing the Court's judgment, which was joined by Chief Justice Rehnquist and Justices Breyer and Kennedy.  O'Connor wrote that although Congress had expressly authorized the detention of enemy combatants in its Authorization for Use of Military Force (AUMF) passed after 9/11, due process required that Hamdi have a meaningful opportunity to challenge his enemy combatant status.

Justice O'Connor used the three-part test of Mathews v. Eldridge to limit the due process to be received.  This required notice of the charges and an opportunity to be heard, though because of the burden of ongoing military conflict upon the executive, normal procedural protections, such as placing the burden of proof on the government or the ban on hearsay, need not apply.  O'Connor suggested the Department of Defense create fact-finding tribunals similar to the AR 190-8 to determine whether a detainee merited continued detention as an enemy combatant.

In response, the United States Department of Defense created Combatant Status Review Tribunals, modeling them after the AR 190-8. O'Connor did not write at length on Hamdi's right to an attorney, because by the time the Court rendered its decision, Hamdi had been granted access to one.  But O'Connor wrote that Hamdi "unquestionably has the right to access to counsel in connection with the proceedings on remand." The plurality held that judges need not be involved in reviewing these cases, rather only that an "impartial decision maker" was required. Justice O'Connor also limited the reach of the Court's conclusion regarding the executive authority to detain enemy combatants:

The plurality asserted that the Judiciary must not defer to the executive with respect to detentions. Instead the constitution empowers the judiciary to act as a check on executive power in this realm. Justice O'Connor wrote:

Souter concurrence and dissent
Justice David Souter, joined by Justice Ruth Bader Ginsburg, concurred with the plurality's judgment that due process protections must be available for Hamdi to challenge his status and detention, providing a majority for that part of the ruling.  However, he dissented from the plurality's ruling that AUMF established Congressional authorization for the detention of enemy combatants.

Scalia dissent 
Justice Antonin Scalia's dissent, joined by Justice John Paul Stevens, went the furthest in restricting the executive power of detention. Scalia asserted that based on historical precedent, the government had two options to detain Hamdi: Congress could suspend the right to habeas corpus, or Hamdi could be tried under normal criminal law. Scalia wrote that the plurality, though well-meaning, had no basis in law for trying to establish new procedures that would be applicable in a challenge to Hamdi's detention - it was only the job of the Court to declare it unconstitutional and order his release or proper arrest, rather than to invent an acceptable process for detention.  Scalia and Stevens also suggested that there is a time-limited exception to the ancient right of habeas corpus:
Where the commitment was for felony or high treason, the [Habeas Corpus Act of 1679] did not require immediate release, but instead required the Crown to commence criminal proceedings within a specified time…. [T]he practical effect of this provision was that imprisonment without indictment or trial for felony or high treason under §7 would not exceed approximately three to six months.

Thomas dissent 
Justice Clarence Thomas was the only justice who sided entirely with the executive branch and the Fourth Circuit's ruling, based on his view of the security interests at stake and the President's broad war-making powers.  Thomas wrote that the Court's rationale would also require due process rights for bombing targets: "Because a decision to bomb a particular target might extinguish life interests, the plurality's analysis seems to require notice to potential targets."  Thomas also wrote that Congress intended that the AUMF authorize such detentions. Thomas would later make use of this dissent in Turner v. Rogers in 2011.

Subsequent developments 
Although by the terms used in the Court's holdings, they were apparently limited to "citizen-detainees," the last paragraph of section III, D of the O'Connor plurality (four justices: O'Connor, Rehnquist, Kennedy, and Breyer) relies on the Geneva Convention and states that habeas corpus should be available to an "alleged enemy combatant."

On the same day, the Court held in Rasul v. Bush (2004) that U.S. courts have jurisdiction to hear habeas corpus petitions filed by the Guantanamo detainees, and other foreign nationals.

The government conceded that some very limited due process rights, allowing for hearings to determine the detainees' status as enemy combatants and the right to legal counsel, would be extended to all of the Guantanamo detainees, citizen and non-citizen alike. The application of the Court's decisions in these cases is consistent with the fact that the other two justices in the Hamdi majority, as well as two of the dissenting justices (Scalia and Stevens), were more restrictive in their willingness to concede any of the detention powers requested by the government for Guantanamo detainees in the Hamdi case.

In regard to the detention of detainees without charge, in section I of the O'Connor plurality opinion, the plurality relied on the time-honored traditions of war, the Geneva Convention, and a long list of other international treaties, to hold that the government had authority under the Authorization for Use of Military Force (2001) to hold any enemy combatants, provided enemy combatants had been seized on the battlefield participating in active hostilities, for the sole objective of preventing an enemy combatant from returning to the battlefield, and then only so long as there continued to be "active hostilities." The plurality held that such protective detention could be applied to both citizen and non-citizen enemy combatants.

The plurality opinion stated:

The U.S. government had argued that it had the right to detain enemy combatants indefinitely for the two purposes of interrogation and to prevent a return to the battlefield. Justice O'Connor rejected the first purpose by stating definitively that "indefinite detention for the purpose of interrogation is not authorized." With regard to the second purpose, the plurality held "Necessary and appropriate force" amounted to authorization to detain "for the duration of the relevant conflict," in order to prevent enemy combatants from rejoining the fight.

Of the four justices outside the plurality, Justices Ginsburg and Souter limited their opinions to their position that Section 4001(a) of Title 18 of the United States Code (the Non-Detention Act; enacted to prevent the sort of detention that occurred when the United States placed Japanese-American citizens in concentration camps during World War II), prevented the detention of U.S. citizens.  Justice Scalia (whose opinion was joined by Justice Stevens), restricted his holding to citizen-detainees and implied that anyone held outside of United States' territory might be beyond the reach of the Court altogether. Again, the Rasul case did not directly address the detention issue, and any hearings would be limited to the determination of enemy combatant status.

 In Hamdan v. Rumsfeld (2006), the Court decided that the "military commissions" created to try unlawful combatants for war crimes suffered from certain fatal procedural defects under the Uniform Code of Military Justice and the Geneva Convention, and were without other legal authority to proceed. They overruled Congress' attempt to deprive the Court of jurisdiction to decide that issue by passing the Detainee Treatment Act.  Justices in the majority (particularly Justices Kennedy and Breyer) disagreed with Justice Stevens as to whether the "charge" of conspiracy could be maintained to justify the determination of unlawful combatant status.  Although the Court struck down the military commissions as created by the Executive Branch, they did not provide the detainees with direct access to the federal courts, but only with access to a fair and impartial hearing to a tribunal constitutionally authorized by Congress and proceeding with certain due process guarantees (such as one operated under terms similar to those provided by Article I courts under the UCMJ or according to the terms of the Third Geneva Convention of 1949).
On October 17, 2006, the president signed the Military Commissions Act, passed by Congress and authorizing a type of military tribunal to be used at Guantanamo Bay detention camp, as requested by the Bush administration. That fall, the administration transferred fourteen high-value detainees to Guantanamo Bay from black sites overseas.
 In Boumediene v. Bush (2008), the Court ruled that detainees, and other foreign nationals, do have the right to direct access to federal courts to challenge their detentions.

See also 
 Donald Rumsfeld
 Center for Constitutional Rights, a New York City–based legal nonprofit organization that legally represents over 150 of the Guantanamo Bay detainees
 Terrorism
 Donald Vance

Footnotes

References

External links
 
NPR audio on the decision
The Center for Constitutional Rights section on Hamdi v. Rumsfeld with detailed documents and insight
FindLaw "war on terror" section
The Supreme Court, the Detainees, and the "War on Terrorism" (FindLaw)
Hamdi v. Rumsfeld: U.S. Supreme Court Brief Resource Center, U.S. Supreme Court Amici Curiæ Briefs (Jenner and Block Law Firm)
Yaser Esam Hamdi v. Donald Rumsfeld Settlement Agreement (FindLaw)

2004 in United States case law
American Civil Liberties Union litigation
Donald Rumsfeld litigation
Guantanamo captives' habeas corpus petitions
United States civil commitment case law
United States habeas corpus case law
United States separation of powers case law
United States Supreme Court cases
United States Supreme Court cases of the Rehnquist Court